Tales DS may refer to the following:

 Tales of the Tempest, the first game in the Tales series to be released on the Nintendo DS.
 Tales of Innocence, the second game in the Tales series to be released on the Nintendo DS.
 Tales of Hearts, the third game in the Tales series to be released on the Nintendo DS.